Sami Kuoppamäki (born 1971) is a Finnish drummer who has been a very prolific jazz and popular music session musician after the break-up of his early-90s band, Kingston Wall. He played on the Von Hertzen Brothers album Approach in 2006 before rejoining the ex-Kingston Wall bassist Jukka Jylli in the band Zook. In 2017 he rejoined Von Hertzen Brothers, and as of 2023, is still recording and touring with them.

Session work 

In 1994 Kuoppamäki played session drums as a stand-in for the popular power metal band Stratovarius, for the recording of their third studio album, Dreamspace (his contribution can be heard on five of the album's songs). This was due to regular drummer Tuomo Lassila suffering from an arm injury.

In 2000–2001 Kuoppamäki played drums in the house band of the Finnish TV show Hotelli Sointu.

In 2003 he played session drums for Apocalyptica for the album Reflections, although the major credits for the drum recordings are given to Slayer's Dave Lombardo. After his participation, Apocalyptica hired Mikko Sirén as permanent drum player.

In 2006 he played drums for Von Hertzen Brothers for their second album Approach.

In 2007 & 2011 he played drums in the live band of the Finnish Idols TV show's finals.

Live work
Kuoppamäki performed with accordionist Kimmo Pohjonen to rave reviews at the "Meltdown on the South Bank" festival in London in 2005.

Discography

References

External links

Finnish drummers
Living people
1971 births
21st-century drummers